Cheng Yun-peng (born 2 June 1973) is a Taiwanese politician and a member of the Legislative Yuan from Taoyuan 1st district.

Early career
Born in Taipei on Dihua Street, Cheng's father graduated from National Cheng Kung University and is a supporter of Tangwai movement. Yun-peng is the second son of the family; he has a brother, Yun-hung.

Cheng graduated from National Taiwan University with a degree in Civil Engineering. When he was a junior, he campaigned with Chen Shui-bian in the Taipei mayoral election. After his mandatory national service, he served as an assistant for Shen Fu-hsiung, Member of the Legislative Yuan. After Frank Hsieh was elected Kaohsiung mayor, Cheng worked in Kaohsiung department of Labor. He briefly served as the Director of Promotion Department in the Democratic Progressive Party.

Political career
Cheng was elected as a Member of Legislative Yuan for Taipei 1st district in 2004. Cheng lost his primary to Kao Chien-chih in the 2008 election after his advertisement scandal. Cheng retired from politics and created a media company. Cheng returned to the Democratic Progressive Party in 2012.

Cheng ran for a Legislative Yuan seat in Taoyuan 1st district in the 2016 election. He won a majority vote of 5,813, defeating five-term veteran Chen Ken-te.

Controversy 
In 2005, Cheng was photographed attending a movie with Chen Hsieh-ling, Tainan city council member. As Cheng was in a serious relationship at the moment, he declared that he did not cheat on his girlfriend.

Cheng was sentenced to six months in jail and three years of deprivation of political rights for a campaign advertising libel suit.

Electoral record 
Incumbents are in bold.

References 

1973 births
National Taiwan University alumni
Living people
Democratic Progressive Party Members of the Legislative Yuan
Taipei Members of the Legislative Yuan
Taoyuan City Members of the Legislative Yuan
Members of the 6th Legislative Yuan
Members of the 9th Legislative Yuan
Members of the 10th Legislative Yuan